Taebla is a small borough in Lääne County, Estonia, the administrative centre of Lääne-Nigula Parish. It has a population of 929 (as of 1 January 2010).

Notable people
Michael Roos (born 1982), American football player, was born in Taebla.

References 

Boroughs and small boroughs in Estonia
Kreis Wiek